Strumaria is a genus of African plants in Amaryllis family, subfamily Amaryllidoideae. The genus is known in nature only from South Africa, Lesotho and Namibia. Almost all species flower in the autumn and are cultivated as ornamental bulbous plants.

Description
Species of Strumaria are deciduous bulbous plants. Usually two leaves are produced, although there may be up to six. The flowers generally appear in the autumn with the arrival of the rains; the leaves may appear before, with, or after the flowers. Most species have white flowers, although they may also be pink or yellow. The six stamens are joined to the style, at least at the base. Strumaria is distinguished from other genera in the family Amaryllidaceae by the presence of a thickening at the base of the style, except in Strumaria spiralis, previously placed in its own genus Carpolyza. When dry, the fruiting heads detach from the scape and are rolled away by the wind, thus dispersing the seeds.

Species
Accepted:

 Strumaria aestivalis Snijman – Northern Cape Province
 Strumaria argillicola G.D.Duncan – Northern Cape Province
 Strumaria barbarae Oberm. – Namibia, Northern Cape Province
 Strumaria bidentata Schinz – Namibia, Northern Cape Province
 Strumaria chaplinii (W.F.Barker) Snijman – Western Cape Province
 Strumaria discifera Marloth ex Snijman – Western Cape Province, Northern Cape Province
 Strumaria gemmata Ker Gawl. – Western Cape Province, Northern Cape Province, Eastern Cape Province, Free State
 Strumaria hardyana D.Müll.-Doblies & U.Müll.-Doblies – Namibia
 Strumaria karooica (W.F.Barker) Snijman – Western Cape Province, Northern Cape Province
 Strumaria karoopoortensis (D.Müll.-Doblies & U.Müll.-Doblies) Snijman – Western Cape Province, Northern Cape Province
 Strumaria leipoldtii (L.Bolus) Snijman – Western Cape Province
 Strumaria luteoloba Snijman – Namibia, Northern Cape Province
 Strumaria massoniella (D.Müll.-Doblies & U.Müll.-Doblies) Snijman – Northern Cape Province
 Strumaria merxmuelleriana (D.Müll.-Doblies & U.Müll.-Doblies) Snijman – Northern Cape Province
 Strumaria perryae Snijman – Northern Cape Province
 Strumaria phonolithica Dinter – Namibia
 Strumaria picta W.F.Barker – Northern Cape Province
 Strumaria prolifera Snijman – Northern Cape Province
 Strumaria pubescens W.F.Barker – Western Cape Province, Northern Cape Province
 Strumaria pygmaea Snijman – Western Cape Province, Northern Cape Province
 Strumaria salteri W.F.Barker – Western Cape Province
 Strumaria speciosa Snijman – Namibia
 Strumaria spiralis (L'Hér.) W.T.Aiton – Western Cape Province
 Strumaria tenella (L.f.) Snijman – Western Cape Province, Northern Cape Province, Lesotho
 Strumaria truncata Jacq. – Western Cape Province, Northern Cape Province, Namibia
 Strumaria unguiculata (W.F.Barker) Snijman – Western Cape Province, Northern Cape Province
 Strumaria villosa Snijman – Northern Cape Province
 Strumaria watermeyeri L.Bolus – Northern Cape Province

Formerly included
A few names have been coined using the name Strumaria, applied to species now considered better suited to other genera (Hessea and Libertia). 
 Strumaria chilensis - Libertia chilensis 
 Strumaria crispa - Hessea cinnamomea 
 Strumaria stellaris - Hessea stellaris

Distribution and habitat
Species of Strumaria are native to South Africa (the Cape Provinces and the Free State), Lesotho and Namibia. All but one species are found in the winter rainfall area of Southern Africa, to the west and southwest, with the highest concentration in the highlands of Namaqualand. The exception is Strumaria tenella subsp. orientalis, found to the east in the Free State and Lesotho.

Cultivation
Some Strumaria species are cultivated as ornamental bulbous plants, particularly for their autumn flowering period. The medium in which they are grown needs to be free-draining. They can be propagated from seeds, which lack dormancy and so need to be sown as soon as possible after being shed.

References

External links
 Strumaria at the Pacific Bulb Society

 
Amaryllidaceae genera
Flora of Southern Africa
Taxa named by Nikolaus Joseph von Jacquin
Taxonomy articles created by Polbot